Kalongo is a town in the Northern Region of Uganda. It is one of the urban centers in Agago District.

Location
Kalongo is located in the Acholi sub-region. The coordinates of Kalongo, Uganda are 3° 2' 24.00"N, 33° 22' 16.00"E (Latitude:3.04000; Longitude:33.37111).

Population
The 2002 national population census estimated the town's population at 9,700. In 2010, the Uganda Bureau of Statistics (UBOS) estimated the population at 14,300. In 2011, UBOS estimated the mid-year population at 15,000.

In 2015, the population of the town was projected at 11,800. In 2020, the mid-year population of the town was projected at 12,800, with 6,900 (53.9 percent) females and 5,900 (46.1 percent) males. It was calculated that the population of the town increased at an average annual rate of 1.9 percent, between 2015 and 2020.

Points of interest
The following points of interest are found in the town of Kalongo, or near the edges of the town:

1. Theoffices of Kalongo Town Council

2. Kalongo central market

3. Kalongo School of Nursing & Midwifery, a nursing and midwifery school affiliated with and administered by the Dr. Ambrosoli Memorial Hospital

4.

5. St. Charles Lwanga College, a mixed, boarding, secondary school (S1 - S6) affiliated with the Catholic Church

6. Kalongo Airstrip, a private airstrip owned and administered by the Dr. Ambrosoli Memorial Hospital

7. St. Mary's School of Midwivery, affiliated with the Dr. Ambrosoli Memorial Hospital, with 120 students in 2011

8. Dr. Ambrosoli Memorial Hospital, a 350-bed community hospital administered by the Roman Catholic Archdiocese of Gulu

See also
Agago
List of cities and towns in Uganda

References

External links
Profile of the Dr. Ambrosoli Memorial Hospital
Profile of the Acholi People

Populated places in Northern Region, Uganda
Agago District
Acholi sub-region